Charles Alan Blake Clemetson FRCOG, FRCSC, FACOG (31 October 1923 – 30 August 2006) was a medical doctor, scientist and researcher who published over 48 medical papers and a three-volume monograph, Vitamin C. During his hospital and teaching career, he specialised in obstetrics and gynecology. After retirement in 1991 he devoted his time to researching and publishing papers on Barlow's disease (scurvy in infants), hypothesizing this to be a cause of shaken baby syndrome.

Biography
Clemetson was born in Canterbury, England, attending Wootton Court preparatory school, Wootton, Kent (1930–1935) and The King's School, Canterbury (1935–1942). After preclinical studies at Magdalen College, University of Oxford, he completed his training at Radcliffe Infirmary, graduating from Oxford University Medical School in 1948 with Bachelor of Medicine & Bachelor of Surgery (B.M., B.Ch) degrees.

He married Helen Cowan Forster, a physiotherapist, on 29 March 1947. They had four children.

After graduation, he became a Royal Air Force medical officer for two years, and then returned to Oxford University in 1950 for a MA degree. In 1950, as a research assistant in Obstetrics, he started to pursue research into preeclamptic toxaemia and started to publish medical papers in 1953. In 1952, he was named a Nichols Research Fellow of the Royal Society of Medicine. From 1952 through 1956, he served at various hospitals in England as the House Surgeon of either Obstetrics or Gynecology and, in 1956, became a lecturer in Obstetrics and Gynecology at London University.

Clemetson immigrated to Saskatoon, Canada (1958–1961), becoming an assistant professor of Obstetrics and Gynecology at the University of Saskatoon. During this period, he began to be interested in vitamin C while on an expedition to Rankin Inlet, Nunavut on Hudson Bay. Clemetson was impressed by the good capillary strength of the local Inuit and surmised this to be due to raw fish in their diet.

Then, in 1961, he moved to California and assumed a position as an assistant professor of Obstetrics and Gynecology at the University of California, San Francisco Medical Center, and a lecturer in the Department of Maternal and Child Health at the University of California, Berkeley.

In 1967, he assumed a teaching position (1967–1972) as an assistant professor of Obstetrics and Gynecology with the State University of New York, Brooklyn. He also became the Director of the Obstetrics and Gynecology Department (1967–1981) at the Methodist Hospital of Brooklyn, New York. In addition (1972–1981), he served as a professor in the Department of Obstetrics and Gynecology at the Downstate Medical Center of the State University of New York, Brooklyn, New York.

Clemetson moved to New Orleans, Louisiana in 1981, and became a professor of Obstetrics and Gynecology at Tulane University School of Medicine, and the Director of Obstetrics and Gynecology at the Huey P. Long Medical Center, Pineville, Louisiana. He also became a consultant in Gynecology for the Department of Surgery, Veterans Administration Hospital, Pineville, Louisiana.

Upon his retirement in 1991 as a Professor Emeritus, Tulane University School of Medicine, Clemetson devoted his remaining years to writing and publishing medical papers concerning shaken baby syndrome.

Near the end of his life, he narrowly escaped the New Orleans disaster from Hurricane Katrina, having been warned by his caregiver's meteorologist brother-in-law. He escaped with the latter over the Lake Pontchartrain bridge the day before it was destroyed. He lived in Houston, Texas for nearly a year while his family restored his house, but died of heart failure a few weeks after this was completed.

Achievements
Clemetson had a long and distinguished academic career as a medical doctor, scientist and researcher. During his forty-year professional career, he implemented numerous scientific studies and was instrumental in furthering scientific knowledge. The following achievements are highlights of his life's work that are contained in his extensive Curriculum Vitae.

Clemetson's most notable medico-legal achievement was as the father of the "Motherhood Bill", which requires that all medical insurance carriers in the State of New York include coverage for pregnancy and complications of pregnancy. This so-called Donovan Bill rapidly spread to all 50 states.

University College Hospital – London – 1950–1952 / 1956–1958
Demonstrated the effects of cord around the neck and of pre-eclampsia on the oxygen saturation of newborn infants.
Published the first study of "small-for-dates" infants in his studies of "the difference in birth weight of human twins."
Demonstrated impaired active transfer of amino acids from mother to fetus in pre-eclampsia.
Demonstrated aortic hypoplasia in some patients following severe early pre-eclampsia.
Performed and published successful open cardiac massage outside of hospital.

University of California Medical Center – San Francisco – 1961–1967
Bioflavonoids and catechins – Solved the old "Vitamin P" problem, by showing that bioflavonoids with certain structural characteristics act as indirect antioxidants for Vitamin C. See: Plant Polyphenols Monograph in New York Academy of Sciences.
Pre-eclampsia – Demonstrated a disturbance of ascorbic acid metabolism in pre-eclampsia and in abruptio placentae.
Methodist Hospital of Brooklyn – New York – 1967–1981
Developed a new method for measuring the bilirubin content of amniotic fluid.
In collaboration with the Department of Anesthesiology, he showed an improved oxygen saturation in the umbilical cord of blood of babies delivered by Caesarean Section under spinal anesthesia when the mother is placed in a left-side-down tilt position.
In collaboration with Drs. Mallikarjuneswara and Moshfeghi, he was able to measure the electrical charge on fertilized rat ova, and this was the first time that anyone had ever measured the electrical charge on any mammalian ovum.
He showed conclusively that women on the pill need more Vitamin C than usual, and, as a result of this, a special vitamin formula called "Feminins" was developed and marketed for women on the pill.
His research on the uterine luminal fluid in the rat showed that estrogen causes secretion and progesterone causes reabsorption of uterine luminal fluid.
In collaboration with J.K. Kim and others, he showed that the luteal phase of the human menstrual cycle is the reabsorptive phase, and not the secretory phase.
In recent research, he has shown that people with low vitamin C levels have very high blood histamine levels.
He was able to relate the above observation to abruptio placentae, as women with low ascorbate (Vitamin C) and high histamine levels are prone to develop premature separation of the placenta.

Tulane University School of Medicine 1981–1990
Wrote three-volume monograph, Vitamin C.

Medical hypotheses
In 1964, Clemetson conducted and published the first studies concerning ascorbic acid (vitamin C) metabolism and depletion in pre-eclampsia.

After Clemetson's retirement from teaching in 1991, his work focused on developing the hypothesis that the hemorrhages seen in infants with shaken baby syndrome are caused not by inflicted trauma, but by capillary damage due to Barlow's disease (subclinical scurvy) – a condition called by proponents Clemetson/Kalokerinos syndrome. The mechanism he argued to be high histamine levels associated with low serum vitamin C, the latter deficiency arising before birth due to factors such as the pregnant mother's malnutrition, and in the infant by recurrent infections and recent multiple vaccinations.

His four main papers on this topic, published in the controversial and non-peer reviewed journal Medical Hypotheses, are: "The key role of histamine in the development of atherosclerosis and coronary heart disease", "Barlow's disease", "Capillary fragility as a cause of subdural hemorrhage in infants" and "Elevated blood histamine caused by vaccinations and vitamin c deficiency may mimic the shaken baby syndrome".

Publications
Books
Vitamin C, Volumes I, II, III. Monograph by C.A.B. Clemetson, 1989 CRC Press, Boca Raton, Florida, 

Journal articles

Clemetson CA (2004) "Was it "shaken baby" or a variant of Barlow's disease?" J Am Phys Surg 9: 78–80 (PDF)
Clemetson, CAB (2004) "Capillary Fragility as a Cause of Subdural and Retinal Hemorrhages in Infancy." Red Flags – Editorial – 10 August

Clemetson CA (2002) "Shaken baby or scurvy?" Journal of Orthomolecular Medicine 17(4):193-196

Clemetson CA (2002) Was the baby shaken? Townsend Letter for Doctors and Patients  #222, pp. 112–13
Clemetson CA (1999) "Vaccinations, inoculations and ascorbic acid." J. Orthomolecular Medicine 14:137–142

Champagne ET, Hinojosa O, and Clemetson CA (1990) "Production of Ascorbate Free Radicals in Infant Formulas and Other Media." J Food Sci 55(4):1133-6.

Clemetson CA (1969) "Menorrhagia rheumatica." La Vie Medicale, No Hors Serie, Decembre, pp 1–10: Symposium International – Paroi Vasculaire et Flavonoides – Comptes Rendus – Hospital Saint-Antoine, Paris, 27 June.
Clemetson CA (1966) l Bioflavonoidi Quali Antioossidanti per L’AQcido Ascorbico Symposium sui Biolavonoidi, Stresa, Italy 23 April, pp 584–593

Recommended Dietary Allowances: 10th Edition (1989)
  “Water Soluble Vitamins – Vitamin C” Chapter 8 p 115 Clemetson, C.A.B. 1980. Histamine and ascorbic acid in human blood. J. Nutr. 110:662–668.
Biologic Markers in Reproductive Toxicology (1989)
 “Cell Biology: Identifying Biologic Markers Expressed During Early Pregnancy”   Chapter 20  p 227 Clemetson CAB, Kim JK, De Jesus TP, Mallikarjuneswara VR, Wilds JH. 1973 "Human Uterine Fluid Potassium and the Menstrual Cycle." J Obstet Gynaecol Br Commonw. Jun;80(6):553-61.

Memberships in learned societies
 Member of the British Medical Association
 Fellow of the Royal Society of Medicine
 Member of the New York Academy of Sciences
 Member of the New York Obstetrical Society
 President of the Brooklyn Gynecological Society
 Member of the Medical Society of the County of Kings and Academy of Medicine of Brooklyn
 Fellow of the American College of Obstetricians and Gynaecologists
 Fellow of the Royal College of Surgeons of Canada
 Fellow of the American College of Nutrition

Notes and references

See also
 Viera Scheibner
 Archie Kalokerinos

External links
 Clemetson's editorial comments on the Alan Yurko shaken baby syndrome case

1923 births
2006 deaths
English gynaecologists
English obstetricians
Orthomolecular medicine advocates
People from Canterbury
Fellows of the Royal Society of Medicine
Fellows of the Royal College of Physicians and Surgeons of Canada
Fellows of the American College of Nutrition
Fellows of the Royal College of Obstetricians and Gynaecologists